Burning Bright is a 2010 horror thriller film directed by Carlos Brooks and starring Briana Evigan, Garret Dillahunt, Meat Loaf, and Charlie Tahan. The film depicts the attempts of a young woman and her younger autistic brother to ward off a hungry tiger trapped in a house with them during a hurricane. Released on August 17, 2010, the film is distributed by Lionsgate.

Plot

John Gaveneau buys a tiger as part of his plans to set up a safari park. Meanwhile, John's stepdaughter, Kelly, is with her autistic brother, Tom, whom she has taken to a special hospital for him to be cared for while she is at college. However, Kelly's payment to the hospital is rejected and, upon calling her bank, she is informed that John withdrew all the money and closed the account.

After bringing the tiger home, John instructs his workers to board up the house in preparation for an approaching hurricane. As the windows are being secured, Kelly confronts John and begs him to give her the remainder of the money; he explains that he spent it all on the tiger. Kelly is angry with him, telling him that her mother (who committed suicide by taking an overdose of pills) wanted the money to go to Tom and Kelly. However, there was no official will, so John took the funds for himself. Upset, Kelly calls her college to defer her start until the second semester, citing family issues; however, she has already deferred twice, and her professor tells her that if she does not start college that semester, he will give the scholarship money to someone else.

Upon going home and sending Tom to bed, she sleeps and dreams of suffocating Tom so that she won't have to take care of him anymore. While she sleeps, the front door is opened, and an unknown person releases the tiger into the house. When Kelly goes to the kitchen for a drink, she finds a note from John claiming that he has gone to the store. Returning upstairs, she sees the tiger cross the foyer beneath her.

She discovers that all of the windows and doors have been boarded up, and she is trapped. She is horrified to find that Tom is missing from his bed, but she is unable to use the house phone to call for help, as the hurricane has brought down the phone lines. After discovering her phone is not on the charger where it is supposed to be, she realizes that she might have dropped it down the laundry chute with her clothes. She sneaks into the laundry room to retrieve it, and makes another attempt to contact emergency services; due to the high volume of calls, however, she is unable to do so. She tries calling John, but his cell phone is in his car, which is parked outside of a bar; John is inside drinking beer and gambling.

Several close encounters follow between Kelly and the tiger; Kelly and Tom hide in John's study, with Kelly bleeding heavily as a result of her injuries from the tiger. She barricades the door with a desk and bandages her leg. She soon discovers that John has taken out life insurance policies on both her and Tom, and intends to collect the money upon their deaths. She finds a handgun, but there are only five bullets; she loads the gun and sneaks out into the hallway hoping to shoot the tiger, and tells Tom to go to the laundry room. As the tiger approaches, she cocks the gun and fires, but the first chamber is empty and Kelly is forced to flee.

In the laundry room, she is able to break the board-covered window and climbs out just as the tiger breaks in to the room and leaps to attack her. She runs to her car, but as she is trying to start the engine, she remembers that Tom is still alone in the house with the tiger. She returns to the house and climbs back in through the window. Upon finding Tom, she promises that she will never abandon him. She intends to lead him to the laundry room, but the tiger attacks. She then instructs Tom to climb into the massive chest freezer John had bought upon deciding to open the Safari Ranch, and she climbs into it as well. Safe from the tiger, she hums a lullaby for Tom, and he falls asleep.

The next morning, Kelly wakes to the faint sounds of drilling; John is removing the board from the front door. Kelly and Tom climb out of the freezer and walk into the foyer to see John wielding a rifle, intending to kill the tiger. Kelly pleads for John to let them go. It is then that John reveals that Kelly's mom was going to leave him, so he killed her and made it look like suicide. Following the murder, he removed Kelly and Tom from life insurance, and admits he was responsible for sending the tiger into the house to kill them. Suddenly, the tiger leaps and attacks John. It then proceeds to eat him, allowing Kelly and Tom to sneak out of the house. Standing outside among debris from the hurricane, Tom takes Kelly's hand and they begin to walk away.

Cast
 Briana Evigan as Kelly Taylor
 Charlie Tahan as Tom Taylor
 Garret Dillahunt as Johnny Gaveneau
 Peggy Sheffield as Doctor Orsi 
 Mary Rachel Dudley as Catherine Taylor 
 Tom Nowicki as Sheriff  
 Meat Loaf as Howie (uncredited)
 Katie, Schicka and Kismet as the tiger (uncredited)

References

External links 

2010 films
2010 horror films
2010 horror thriller films
American horror thriller films
American natural horror films
Films about animals
Films about autism
Films about dysfunctional families
Films set in Alabama
Films set in 2009
2010s survival films
American horror drama films
American thriller drama films
Films about siblings
American survival films
Films about tigers
2010s English-language films
2010s American films